Sophia Victoria Twisleton-Wykeham-Fiennes (born 12 February 1967), better known as Sophie Fiennes, is an English film director and producer. She is the sister of actors Ralph Fiennes and Joseph Fiennes, director Martha Fiennes and composer Magnus Fiennes.

Career
Fiennes managed the UK based dance company The Michael Clark Company from 1992 to 1994 and began making her own films in 1998. With Peter Greenaway she worked on films and TV projects including Drowning by Numbers, The Cook, the Thief, His Wife & Her Lover and Prospero's Books.

Films

Show and Tell
Made for ZDF/Arte is about Les Ballets C. de la B.'s dance performance VSPRS. A the dimensions of ecstasy and trauma that form the core of the performance are captured, whilst interviews with Platel and the dancers themselves are also included.

The Pervert's Guide to Cinema
Fiennes' documentary The Pervert's Guide to Cinema, is written and presented by the philosopher and psychoanalyst Slavoj Žižek.

Fiennes and Žižek then filmed a followup, The Pervert's Guide to Ideology. The format is similar, with Žižek speaking from within reconstructed scenes from films. This time the films include Full Metal Jacket, Taxi Driver, They Live and The Sound of Music.

Family
Fiennes is the daughter of the photographer Mark Fiennes and the novelist and painter Jennifer Lash. She is the sister of Ralph, Martha, Magnus, Joseph and Jacob Fiennes. In an interview with the Evening Standard, Fiennes said that "We were the branch of the family everyone was slightly embarrassed by."

Awards
Fiennes was awarded a NESTA fellowship in 2001.

Filmography
 1998 Lars from 1-10
 2001 Because I Sing
 2002 Hoover Street Revival
 2005 Ramallah! Ramallah! Ramallah!
 2006 The Pervert's Guide to Cinema
 2007 VSPRS Show and Tell
 2010 Over Your Cities Grass Will Grow
 2012 The Pervert's Guide to Ideology
 2017 Grace Jones: Bloodlight and Bami

Notes

References

External links
 
Sophie Fiennes at the British Film Institute
Sophie Fiennes on the Financial Times
Sophie Fiennes at the Danish Film Institute
Sophie Fiennes at the Austrian Film Commission

English film directors
English film producers
English women film directors
Sophie
1967 births
Living people